Montello is a city in and the county seat of Marquette County, Wisconsin, United States. The population was 1,495 at the 2010 census. The Fox River flows through the city. Montello is home to the largest tree in Wisconsin. A notable attraction in the city is the former granite quarry, which has been transformed into a park with several waterfalls.

Geography

The Fox River flows from east through the middle of Montello. There is a dam in Montello, and the upstream portion of the river to the west of the dam is called Buffalo Lake.

The Montello River flows from the North meeting the Fox at the south end of Montello. The upstream portion of the river above the other dam is Montello Lake.

Demographics

2010 census
As of the census of 2010, there were 1,495 people, 628 households, and 356 families residing in the city. The racial makeup of the city was 95.3% White, 1.7% African American, 0.9% Native American, 0.5% Asian, 0.4% from other races, and 1.2% from two or more races. Hispanic or Latino of any race were 2.9% of the population.

There were 628 households, of which 27.1% had children under the age of 18 living with them, 39.8% were married couples living together, 11.1% had a female householder with no husband present, 5.7% had a male householder with no wife present, and 43.3% were non-families. 37.6% of all households were made up of individuals, and 21.6% had someone living alone who was 65 years of age or older. The average household size was 2.23 and the average family size was 2.89.

The median age in the city was 44.1 years. 21.2% of residents were under the age of 18; 7.9% were between the ages of 18 and 24; 22.1% were from 25 to 44; 25.9% were from 45 to 64; and 23% were 65 years of age or older. The gender makeup of the city was 49.6% male and 50.4% female.

2000 census
As of the census of 2000, there were 1,397 people, 591 households, and 348 families residing in the city. The population density was 732.6 people per square mile (282.4/km2). There were 677 housing units at an average density of 355.0 per square mile (136.9/km2). The racial makeup of the city was 96.13% White, 0.29% Black or African American, 1.00% Native American, 0.43% Asian, 0.14% Pacific Islander, 1.15% from other races, and 0.86% from two or more races. 2.36% of the population were Hispanic or Latino of any race.

There were 591 households, out of which 27.9% had children under the age of 18 living with them, 47.5% were married couples living together, 8.0% had a female householder with no husband present, and 41.1% were non-families. 37.2% of all households were made up of individuals, and 20.1% had someone living alone who was 65 years of age or older. The average household size was 2.25 and the average family size was 2.96.

In the city, the population was spread out, with 23.7% under the age of 18, 7.5% from 18 to 24, 26.3% from 25 to 44, 20.2% from 45 to 64, and 22.3% who were 65 years of age or older. The median age was 40 years. For every 100 females, there were 95.7 males. For every 100 females age 18 and over, there were 95.6 males.

The median income for a household in the city was $32,500, and the median income for a family was $43,625. Males had a median income of $29,438 versus $21,375 for females. The per capita income for the city was $15,676. About 5.4% of families and 9.2% of the population were below the poverty line, including 8.6% of those under age 18 and 10.6% of those age 65 or over.

Religion
St. John's Evangelical Lutheran Church is a member of the Wisconsin Evangelical Lutheran Synod (WELS) in Montello.

Transportation

Roads

The west junction intersection of WIS 22 and WIS 23 is the location of the only traffic light in the county. 
Other highways that enter into Montello are County Highways C, F, K, and Y.

Rails 
Montello was once the eastern terminus of a spur line of the Wisconsin Central Railroad built in 1882 to service the granite quarry and other industries. This line split from the WC's Stevens Point-Portage line (the "P" Line) at Packwaukee, and ran along the north shore of Buffalo Lake to Montello. The P-Line was abandoned in 1946 along with the Montello spur despite the fact that there was still almost daily service on it.

Notable people
K. J. Callahan, Wisconsin state legislator
B. Frank Goodell, Wisconsin state legislator
Charles S. Kelsey, Wisconsin state legislator
Edwin B. Kelsey, lawyer, businessman, Wisconsin state legislator
James F. McDowell, Wisconsin state legislator
Spencer A. Pease, Wisconsin state legislator
William A. Schmidt, Wisconsin state legislator

Popular culture
Underground Sunshine, a psychedelic rock band, is from Montello.
 A season 4 episode of the Discovery Channel series A Haunting, called Legend Trippers, takes place in Montello and the nearby town of Green Lake.

Images

References

External links

Montello Chamber of Commerce
Sanborn fire insurance map: 1894

Cities in Wisconsin
Cities in Marquette County, Wisconsin
County seats in Wisconsin